William Gibbes may refer to:

William Gibbes (MP for Suffolk) (died 1689)
William Gibbes (died 1570), MP for Launceston (UK Parliament constituency)
William Gibbes (died c.1586), MP for Worcester (UK Parliament constituency)
William Gibbes (cricketer), New Zealand cricketer
William John Gibbes (1815–1868), son of John George Nathaniel Gibbes

See also
William Gibbes House, Charleston, South Carolina

Gibbes (surname)
William Gibbs (disambiguation)
William Gibb (disambiguation)